Sarcosoma globosum, or witches cauldron, is a species of fungus in the family Sarcosomataceae. It was first described in 1793 by Casimir Christoph Schmidel. Johann Xaver Robert Caspary transferred it to the genus Sarcosoma in 1891.

Also known as the Charred-Pancake Cup, is a near-threatened fungus native to Northern Europe. It is rarely found in some parts of northeastern North America, particularly in the Great Lakes region. To biologists' surprise, in 2021 it was found in Northern British Columbia.

The witches cauldron is an ascomycete or sac fungus, meaning that its microscopic structure utilizes the ascus, a spore-bearing cell, for sexual reproduction. It is a detritivore, and survives on decomposing matter, most commonly leaf litter. It is found in spruce forests and does not currently have any human uses.

Description and range 
Sarcosoma globosum is most commonly studied in Northern Europe, particularly Sweden, however, its population has been in decline for the past 50 years. Its preference of well-drained, nutrient-rich soil near rivers and streams coupled with its success in specifically light spruce forest has caused its regional extinction in central Europe.

It is native to Canada, Czech Republic, Estonia, Finland, Latvia, Norway, Poland, Russia, Sweden, Ukraine, and the United States. It has been classified regionally extinct in Germany, Lithuania, and Slovakia.

Ecology 
The witches cauldron is found along streams and brooks in Northern Europe, where it has been studied and observed most thoroughly in Estonia, Finland, and Sweden, while in Norway it has become extinct. The fruit bodies of the Sarcosoma globosum are described as big, round, and barrel-like, 5-10 centimeters in diameter. Dark brown and even blackish in color, the witches cauldron can be glossy and velvety with a gelatinous inside. Its fruit bodies flatten and wrinkle with time.

The striking appearance of the fungus has made it easy to spot for tourists, who later report their findings to museums, researchers, and citizen science initiatives. Some researchers in Finland introduced the idea that these fungus could be an indicator of climate change in Fennoscandia.

Conservation threats to habitat 
Some of the habitats of this fungus have been destroyed due to human activity associated with urban sprawl, such as the building of roads and houses or forestry. However, some anthropogenic habitat degradation has actually allowed the species to flourish. Dense forest is not suitable for the Sarcosoma globosum and, therefore, the introduction of grazing cattle into the agroforest actually allowed the fungus to flourish in 1950s. The species seems to flourish in selective logging zones, but it is unable to persist in forests that have been clear-cut and do not re-colonize barren zones.

Conservation actions needed 
Witches cauldron is nationally red-listed or classified as rare in 12 countries and regions in Europe. The Swedish EPA developed a Species Action plan for Sarcosoma globosum from 2010 to 2014.

Research needed 
Population size, distribution, and trends need to be researched as well as the life history and ecology of this understudied fungus. The threats to the habitat of the witches cauldron are the same types of environmental degradation associated with progressing climate change. These need to be acutely identified and action plans need to be drafted and signed to hold countries and regions of the EU accountable.

References

External links

Fungi described in 1793
Fungi of Europe
Pezizales
Fungi of Canada